This is a list of association footballers notable for their contributions to Falkirk F.C., from the formation of the club in 1876 to present. It generally includes players who have made more than 100 league appearances for the club, but some players with fewer than 100 appearances are also included. This includes players who represented their national team while with the club, and players who have set a club record, such as most appearances, most goals or biggest transfer fee.

Notable players

Bold type indicates that the player currently plays for the club.

Key to positions
 GK — Goalkeeper
 DF — Defender
 MF — Midfielder
 FW — Forward

Notes

References

Players
 
Falkirk
Association football player non-biographical articles
Players